Rhegmatobius is a genus of ground beetles in the family Carabidae. There are about eight described species in Rhegmatobius.

Species
These eight species belong to the genus Rhegmatobius:
 Rhegmatobius agostini Jeannel, 1937  (Sardinia and Italy)
 Rhegmatobius bastianinii Magrini & Casale, 2015  (Italy)
 Rhegmatobius fiorii (Ganglbauer, 1900)  (Italy)
 Rhegmatobius paganettii Magrini & Pavesi, 1998  (Italy)
 Rhegmatobius petriolii Magrini & Degiovanni, 2008  (Italy)
 Rhegmatobius quadricollis (Ehlers, 1883)  (Italy)
 Rhegmatobius solarii Magrini & Sciaky, 1995  (Italy)
 Rhegmatobius strictus (Baudi di Selve, 1891)  (Sardinia and Italy)

References

Trechinae